Mordellistena eludens is a species of beetle in the genus Mordellistena of the family Mordellidae. It was described in 1999 by Allen and can only be found in British Isles.

References

eludens
Beetles described in 1999
Beetles of Europe